Eurostand was a campaign among European football supporters in 1998. The background was a UEFA ban on standing in the terraces. The campaign was started by Brøndby IF supporters.

The campaign culminated in September that year, when supporter groups around Europe decided to sit down and keep quiet for the first half of a game involving their favourite team. The purpose was to show the difference between a standing crowd and a sedentary one. The campaign had little success, although many fans did keep quiet. It appears unlikely the current ban on standing on the terraces will be lifted in the foreseeable future.

The all-seater restoration of European football grounds followed in the wake of the Hillsborough disaster in 1989.

The campaign was revived in 2008, started by the same group of Brøndby IF supporters, and with big participation all around Europe.

1997–98 in European football
1998–99 in European football
Association football supporters' associations